Pseudolaguvia viriosa is a species of catfish from the Brahmaputra River drainage in India.

References

Catfish of Asia
Fish of India
Taxa named by Heok Hee Ng
Taxa named by Lakpa Tamang
Fish described in 2012
Erethistidae